Diouzer da Cruz dos Santos (born 26 September 1986), simply known as Dio, is a former professional footballer who played as a midfielder.

References

External links
 
 

1986 births
Living people
Sportspeople from Rio Grande do Sul
Equatorial Guinea international footballers
Equatoguinean footballers
Brazilian footballers
Association football midfielders
Associação Atlética Coruripe players
Red Bull Brasil players
Clube de Regatas Brasil players
Associação Atlética Anapolina players
Centro Sportivo Alagoano players
Campinense Clube players
Mixto Esporte Clube players
Deportes Quindío footballers
Maghreb de Fès players
Campeonato Brasileiro Série B players
Categoría Primera A players
Brazilian expatriate footballers
Brazilian expatriate sportspeople in Tunisia
Expatriate footballers in Tunisia
Brazilian expatriate sportspeople in Colombia
Expatriate footballers in Colombia
Brazilian expatriate sportspeople in Morocco
Expatriate footballers in Morocco
Naturalized citizens of Equatorial Guinea
AS Gabès players